Gorice is a village in the municipality of Brčko, Bosnia and Herzegovina. The village lies next to the Sava river and the state border with Croatia with the village of Rajevo Selo on the other bank of the river.

Demographics 
According to the 2013 census, its population was 654.

References

Villages in Brčko District